Hà Huy Tập is a ward of Hà Tĩnh city in Hà Tĩnh Province, Vietnam.

References

Communes of Hà Tĩnh province
Populated places in Hà Tĩnh province